"Infinity" is the fifth single by the band Girl Next Door and it was released on June 10, 2009. Infinity was used as the theme song of Japanese drama Atashinchi no Danshi.

CD Track listing 
 Infinity
 If
 Jōnetsu no Daishō (Diamond Mirror SCP Version)
 Seeds of dream (Ice Cream Mix)
 Infinity (Instrumental)

DVD Track listing 
 Infinity (Music Video)

Charts

Oricon Sales Chart

Billboard Japan

External links 
  

2009 singles
Girl Next Door (band) songs
Japanese television drama theme songs
Oricon Weekly number-one singles
2009 songs
Avex Trax singles